Ponta Porã International Airport  is the airport serving Ponta Porã, Brazil.

During a transitional period, the airport is jointly operated by Infraero and AENA.

History
The airport was commissioned on March 11, 1955.

Previously operated by Infraero, on August 18, 2022 the consortium AENA won a 30-year concession to operate the airport.

Airlines and destinations

Access

See also

List of airports in Brazil

References

External links

Airports in Mato Grosso do Sul
Airports established in 1955
1955 establishments in Brazil
Ponta Porã